Enok Johannes Palm (5 December 1924 – 31 August 2012) was a Norwegian mathematician.

He was born in Kristiansand. He took the cand.real. degree in 1950 and the dr.philos. degree at the University of Oslo in 1954. He was a professor in mechanics at the Norwegian Institute of Technology from 1960 to 1963 and professor of applied mathematics at the University of Oslo until 1963 to 1994. He was a fellow of the Norwegian Academy of Science and Letters from 1959 and the Royal Norwegian Society of Sciences and Letters from 1961. He was decorated as a Knight, First Class of the Order of St. Olav in 1993.

References

1924 births
2012 deaths
People from Kristiansand
University of Oslo alumni
Academic staff of the Norwegian Institute of Technology
Academic staff of the University of Oslo
Norwegian mathematicians
Members of the Norwegian Academy of Science and Letters
Royal Norwegian Society of Sciences and Letters